The Professional Skaters Guild of America is an association of figure skating coaches. On January 21, 1950 at the Broadmoor in Colorado Springs, the American Skaters Guild was reorganized and renamed the Professional Skaters Guild of America. The former Canadian members of the American Skaters Guild split away and created the Professional Skaters Guild of Canada.

The first “official” meeting was held during Nationals two months later in Washington, D.C., on March 25. Walter Arian served as chairman for the day. Ultimately, Edi Scholdan was appointed chairman. Maribel Vinson presented the minutes of the 1949 meeting. Also presented were reports of the sectional meetings; Freddy Mesot - Easterns, Edi Scholdan - Midwesterns, Maribel Vinson - Pacific Coast. Plans for the constitution were also discussed.

In the fall of 1950 another meeting was held. Though many topics were discussed, the most prominent resolution was to send the secretary to New York to attend a meeting of the PSGA and USFSA. Dues were raised to $20.

The first office of the PSGA was established in Colorado Springs, Colorado in 1950. Agnes Hutchinson became the secretary. Her first project was to prepare an ad and some promotional folders announcing the revival of the Guild.

Another very important program introduced was the Job Bureau. Operated by Mrs. Blanchard, it was available to members looking for new positions. This program resembles the Job Placement Directory which is still in use today by the Professional Skaters Association (PSA).

Avonelle O'Connell, wife of Bob O'Connell, president of the Guild at the time, designed the logo which was sent to Agnes Hutchinson secretary of the Guild and it was accepted as the official logo of the Professional Skaters Guild Of America. It was not designed in 1951 but in 1956.

References

Figure skating organizations
Sports organizations established in 1950